Wise Guys is an upcoming American gangster film directed by Barry Levinson and written by Nicholas Pileggi. The film stars Robert De Niro in a dual role as 1950s mob bosses Vito Genovese and Frank Costello. The film is produced by Warner Bros. and Winkler Films.

Premise 
Vito Genovese and Frank Costello are competing Italian-American mob bosses, and Genovese orders a hit on Costello.  Costello survives but is wounded in the attempt and ultimately decides to retire from the Mafia.

Cast 
 Robert De Niro as both Vito Genovese and Frank Costello
 Debra Messing as Bobbie Costello, Frank's wife
 Kathrine Narducci as Anna Genovese, Vito's wife
 Cosmo Jarvis

Production 
The film was in the works from as early as the 1970s but over the decades was passed on by every major studio. Warner Bros. Pictures began work on Wise Guys in May 2022 and gave it the greenlight that August. Nicholas Pileggi wrote the script and Barry Levinson directed the film starring Robert De Niro in a double role. In October 2022, Debra Messing and Kathrine Narducci joined the cast. In January 2023, Cosmo Jarvis joined the cast.

The production used vehicle vinyl wraps on 1950s-era cars and trucks to make the vehicles look new in the film. Filming took place in December 2022 in Ohio.  The production shut down part of US 35 in Greene County, as well as SR 123 in the greater Cincinnati area before moving to the suburbs of Cincinnati.

References

External links 
 

Films directed by Barry Levinson
American gangster films
English-language films
Films shot in Cincinnati
Films shot in Ohio
Warner Bros. films
Films set in the 1950s
Upcoming films